The canton of Bédarrides  is a French former administrative division in the department of Vaucluse and region Provence-Alpes-Côte d'Azur. It had 39,677 inhabitants (2012). It was disbanded following the French canton reorganisation which came into effect in March 2015.

Composition
The communes in the canton of Bédarrides:
Bédarrides
Courthézon
Sorgues
Vedène

References

Former cantons of Vaucluse
2015 disestablishments in France
States and territories disestablished in 2015